Pieces of the Sky is the second studio album and major-label debut by American country music artist Emmylou Harris, released on February 7, 1975, through Reprise Records.

Although she had released the obscure folk-styled Gliding Bird five years earlier, Pieces of the Sky became the album that launched Harris's career and is widely considered to be her début. In those intervening years she forged a musical relationship with Gram Parsons that altered the musical direction of her career. The album includes Harris's first high-charting Billboard country hit, the #4 "If I Could Only Win Your Love," and the relatively low-charting #73 "Too Far Gone" (originally a 1967 hit for Tammy Wynette). The overall song selection was varied and showed early on how eclectic Harris's musical tastes were. In addition to her own "Boulder to Birmingham" (written for Gram Parsons, who had died the previous year), she included the Merle Haggard classic "The Bottle Let Me Down," The Beatles' "For No One," and Dolly Parton's "Coat of Many Colors."  (Parton, in turn, covered "Boulder to Birmingham" on her 1976 album All I Can Do.) On Shel Silverstein's "Queen Of The Silver Dollar," Harris's longtime friend and vocal collaborator, Linda Ronstadt, sings harmony.

Pieces of the Sky rose as far as the #7 spot on the Billboard country albums chart.

Pieces of the Sky was included in Robert Dimery's 1001 Albums You Must Hear Before You Die.

Track listing

Bonus tracks
A 2004 CD reissue added two previously unissued bonus tracks:
 "Hank and Lefty" (Dallas Frazier, Doodle Owens) – 2:50
 "California Cottonfields" (Dallas Frazier, Earl Montgomery) – 2:47

Personnel

Emmylou Harris – vocals, acoustic guitar
Brian Ahern – acoustic guitar, guitar, bass
Bruce Archer – acoustic guitar
Duke Bardwell – bass
Byron Berline – fiddle, mandolin
James Burton – electric guitar, Gut-string guitar, Dobro
Mark Cuff – drums
Rick Cunha – acoustic guitar, guitar
Nick DeCaro – string arrangements
Amos Garrett – electric guitar
Richard Greene – fiddle
Tom Guidera – bass
Glen Hardin – piano, electric piano, string arrangements
Ben Keith – pedal steel
Bernie Leadon – acoustic guitar, bass, banjo, dobro, backing vocals
Bill Payne – piano
Herb Pedersen – acoustic guitar, 12-string guitar, banjo, backing vocals
Danny Pendleton – pedal steel
Ray Pohlman – bass
Linda Ronstadt – backing vocals
Ricky Skaggs – fiddle, viola
Fayssoux Starling – backing vocals
Ron Tutt – drums
Technical
Brian Ahern – producer, engineer
Chris Skene – engineer
Paul Skene – engineer
Fran Tate – engineer
Stuart Taylor – engineer
Lisa Phillips – angel drawings on cover

References

External links

Pieces of the Sky (Adobe Flash) at Radio3Net (streamed copy where licensed)

Emmylou Harris albums
1975 albums
Albums produced by Brian Ahern (producer)
Reprise Records albums